Bouchaib Zeroual (born 1917) is a Moroccan former sports shooter. He competed in the 50 metre rifle, three positions and 50 metre rifle, prone events at the 1960 Summer Olympics.

References

External links

1917 births
Possibly living people
Moroccan male sport shooters
Olympic shooters of Morocco
Shooters at the 1960 Summer Olympics
Sportspeople from Rabat